Jack Sinfield (born 21 September 2004) is a rugby league footballer who plays as a  for Leeds Rhinos in the Super League.

In 2021, Sinfield joined Leeds' first team from their academy and was included in their match day squad for a pre-season fixture against Wakefield Trinity on Boxing Day. In April 2022, he made his professional debut for Leeds against Castleford Tigers, his first appearance coinciding with that of another 17 year old, Max Simpson. His father is former Leeds captain Kevin Sinfield.

References

External links
Leeds Rhinos profile

2004 births
Living people
English rugby league players
Leeds Rhinos players
Rugby league hookers
Rugby league players from Oldham